Captain Fracasse (French: Le Capitaine Fracasse, Italian: Capitan Fracassa) is a 1961 French-Italian  historical adventure film written and directed by Pierre Gaspard-Huit and starring Jean Marais, Geneviève Grad and Gérard Barray. The scenario was based on the 1863 novel Captain Fracasse by Théophile Gautier. It was shot at the Epinay Studios in Paris and on location in the Forest of Rambouillet and the Château de Maintenon.

Cast 
 Jean Marais as Baron Philippe de Sigognac, alias "Le Capitaine Fracasse"
 Geneviève Grad as Isabelle, an actress in the troupe
 Gérard Barray as Duke of Vallombreuse
 Louis de Funès as Scapin, an actor in the troupe
 Philippe Noiret as Hérode, the representative for the troupe of actors
 Jean Rochefort as Malartic
 Riccardo Garrone as Jaquemin Lampourde
 Anna Maria Ferrero as Marquise de Bruyères
 Robert Pizani as Blazius, an actor in the troupe
 Danielle Godet as Sérafina, an actress in the troupe
 Bernard Dhéran as Knight of Vidalenc
 Jacques Toja as an actor in the troupe
  as Agostin, the pitcher of knives
 Sacha Pitoeff as Matamore, an actor in the troupe
 Maurice Teynac as Marquis Edouard des Bruyères
 Jean Yonnel as Prince of Moussy
 Renée Passeur as Dame Léonarde, the duenna of the troupe
 Paul Préboist as A killed guard

References

Bibliography
 Klossner, Michael. The Europe of 1500-1815 on Film and Television: A Worldwide Filmography of Over 2550 Works, 1895 Through 2000. McFarland & Company, 2002.
 Moine, Raphaëlle. Cinema Genre. John Wiley & Sons, 2009.

External links 
 
 Le Capitaine Fracasse (1961) at the Films de France

1961 films
1960s historical adventure films
French historical adventure films
Italian historical adventure films

1960s French-language films
Films directed by Pierre Gaspard-Huit
Films set in the 17th century
Films based on Captain Fracasse
Films shot at Epinay Studios
1960s French films
1960s Italian films